Bartosz Kieliba (born 1 August 1990) is a Polish professional footballer who plays as a centre-back for Warta Poznań.

References

External links

1990 births
Living people
Polish footballers
Association football defenders
Jarota Jarocin players
Warta Poznań players
Ekstraklasa players
I liga players
II liga players
III liga players
People from Krotoszyn